A History of the Civil War, 1861–1865  is a book by James Ford Rhodes. It won the Pulitzer Prize for History in 1918.The book is about the American Civil War.

References

External links
 
 

Pulitzer Prize for History-winning works
American history books
American political books
History books about the American Civil War
1919 non-fiction books